Liam Hyland (born 23 April 1933) is a former Irish Fianna Fáil politician who was an elected representative for over 25 years, as a Senator, Teachta Dála (TD) and Member of the European Parliament (MEP).

Born in Ballacolla, County Laois, Hyland first stood for election to Dáil Éireann at the 1977 general election for Laois–Offaly, when Fianna Fáil secured three out of the five seats. However, the party had ambitiously fielded four candidates and Hyland was the only one not returned to the 21st Dáil. However, he successfully stood for election to the 14th Seanad, being returned by the Industrial and Commercial Panel.

Paddy Lalor, one of the three Fianna Fáil TDs for Laois–Offaly, did not contest the 1981 general election. Fianna Fáil again put forward four candidates, but this time Hyland was the first of three to be elected, taking his seat in the 22nd Dáil. He was re-elected at the five subsequent general elections, of February 1982, November 1982, 1987, 1989 and 1992.

In February 1992, when Albert Reynolds succeeded as Taoiseach, Hyland was appointed as Minister of State at the Department of Agriculture and Food with special responsibility for rural enterprise by the Fianna Fáil–Progressive Democrats government. In January 1993, he was appointed as Minister of State at the Department of Agriculture, Food and Forestry with special responsibility for forestry and rural development by the Fianna Fáil–Labour Party coalition government.

In the 1994 European Parliament election, he was elected as an MEP for the Leinster constituency, and he did not contest the 1997 general election. He was re-elected at the 1999 European Parliament election and retired in 2004.

References

External links

1933 births
Living people
Local councillors in County Laois
Fianna Fáil MEPs
Fianna Fáil TDs
Irish farmers
Members of the 14th Seanad
Members of the 22nd Dáil
Members of the 23rd Dáil
Members of the 24th Dáil
Members of the 25th Dáil
Members of the 26th Dáil
Members of the 27th Dáil
MEPs for the Republic of Ireland 1999–2004
MEPs for the Republic of Ireland 1994–1999
Ministers of State of the 27th Dáil
Ministers of State of the 26th Dáil
Politicians from County Laois
Fianna Fáil senators
People from County Laois